Ventolin may refer to:

 Ventolín, creature of the Cantabrian mythology.
 Salbutamol (albuterol), bronchodilator medication marketed under the brand name Ventolin among others
 Ventolin (EP), a song by Aphex Twin